Gregg Rogell (born February 18, 1967) is an American professional comedian. Born on Long Island, Rogell resides in New York City and is a regular performer at the Comedy Cellar. He has appeared on The Tonight Show, Late Night with Conan O'Brien, Louie, Half Baked, and The Nanny. He has had his own half hour special on Comedy Central, and was a featured performer in the movie The Aristocrats.

External links 
 
 https://web.archive.org/web/20120729194313/http://comedians.jokes.com/gregg-rogell
 https://web.archive.org/web/20070627004926/http://www.thearistocrats.com/
 http://www.comedycellar.com/

American stand-up comedians
Jewish American comedians
Living people
1967 births
People from Nassau County, New York
Comedians from New York (state)
Jewish American male comedians
21st-century American Jews